The basketweave cusk-eel (Ophidion scrippsae) is a fish species in the family Ophidiidae. It is widespread in the eastern Pacific Ocean from Point Arguello in California, United States, to Baja California. The specific name honors the journalist and philanthropist Ellen Browning Scripps (1836-1932) one of the founders of the Scripps Research Institute.

Sources 

basketweave cusk-eel
Fish of the United States
Fish of Mexican Pacific coast
Western North American coastal fauna
basketweave cusk-eel